The People's Democratic Organisation for Independence and Socialism (PDOIS) is a socialist political party in the Gambia. Since 2005, it has been part of the National Alliance for Democracy and Development (NADD). It was part of Coalition 2016 in the 2016 presidential election, whose candidate, Adama Barrow, defeated long-time incumbent Yahya Jammeh. The PDOIS also publishes a party newspaper, Foroyaa, which was noted for its opposition to the Jammeh regime.

History 
The party was founded on 31 July 1986. It emerged from an earlier group, the People's Movement for Independence against Neo-Colonialism and Capitalism in The Gambia (PMINCC), whose members included Halifa Sallah, Sam Sarr, Amie Sillah, Adama Bah and Momodou Sarho. The PMINCC were also believed to be the publishers of the newspaper The Voice of the Future, and six members were put on trial for its publication in 1984, although all were acquitted.

Initially, the PDOIS had no official leader until December 1997, when Sidia Jatta was chosen as its first leader. It began publishing its own newspaper, Foroyaa, in July 1987, where it was critical of the pro-Western foreign policy of Dawda Jawara, and opposed the Senegambia Confederation. In 1987, it put forward five candidates in the parliamentary election, but all were defeated. In 1992, it put forward 14 candidates, but again, all were defeated. Jatta stood in the presidential election that year, and came fourth, winning 5.24% of the vote. The PDOIS was not banned following the 1994 coup by Yahya Jammeh as it did not publicly denounce it, but both Jatta and Sallah turned down the cabinet posts they were offered.

Jatta won 3% of the vote in the 1996 and 2001 presidential elections. In the 1997 parliamentary election, Jatta won their first seat in the National Assembly of Wuli West. In 2002, Jatta retained the seat and Sallah additionally won the seat of Serekunda Central. From 2002 to 2007, PDOIS was the largest opposition party in the National Assembly, and Sallah served as Leader of the Opposition. In 2005, the PDOIS joined the National Alliance for Democracy and Development (NADD), and Sallah was selected as the NADD candidate in the 2006 presidential election, but only won 6% of the vote. In the 2007 parliamentary election, NADD only won one seat, Jatta's, with Sallah losing his.

Leadership 
The party is led by a Central Committee, which is the highest working body of the party. It is composed of the following positions:
 Chairperson – Sidia Jatta
 Vice Chairperson
 Secretary General – Halifa Sallah
 Secretary to the Political Bureau
 Secretary to the Information Bureau – Sam Sarr
 Secretary to the Organizing Bureau
 Secretary to the Bureau on Women and Child Affairs – Amie Sillah
 Secretary to the Youth Bureau
 Treasurer
 Auditor
 Other members as the party Congress determines

Electoral history

Presidential elections

National Assembly elections

References

External links
PDOIS website

Political parties in the Gambia
Socialist parties in Africa
Main
Socialism in the Gambia